La Boissière-du-Doré is a commune in the Loire-Atlantique department in western France.

Population

See also
Communes of the Loire-Atlantique department

References

External links
Official site

Communes of Loire-Atlantique